Stefan Ungerer (born 23 November 1993) is a South African rugby union player for the  in the Pro14. His regular position is scrum-half.

Career

Youth level

Sharks

S.A. Under-20
Ungerer was included in the training group that toured Argentina in preparation for the 2013 IRB Junior World Championship. He was then included in the squad for the 2013 IRB Junior World Championship.

References

1993 births
Living people
Alumni of Maritzburg College
Eastern Province Elephants players
Griquas (rugby union) players
Pumas (Currie Cup) players
Rugby union players from Pietermaritzburg
Rugby union scrum-halves
Sharks (Currie Cup) players
Sharks (rugby union) players
South Africa Under-20 international rugby union players
South African rugby union players
Southern Kings players
Stormers players